Palhinandan is a Rural municipality located within the Parasi District of the Lumbini Province of Nepal.
The rural municipality spans  of area, with a total population of 35,429 according to a 2011 Nepal census.

On March 10, 2017, the Government of Nepal restructured the local level bodies into 753 new local level structures.
The previous Rampurwa Harpur, Kusma, Palhi, Gairami and Sanai (some portion excluded) VDCs were merged to form Palhinandan Rural Municipality.
Palhinandan is divided into 6 wards, with Kusma declared the administrative center of the rural municipality.

References

External links
official website of the rural municipality

Rural municipalities in Parasi District
Rural municipalities of Nepal established in 2017